The 2006–07 Wright State Raiders men's basketball team represented Wright State University in the 2006–07 NCAA Division I men's basketball season. The Raiders, led by head coach Brad Brownell, played their home games at the Nutter Center in Dayton, Ohio, as members of the Horizon League. The Raiders won a share of the Horizon League regular season title, and the right to host the 2007 Horizon League tournament. The Raiders won the tournament to earn an automatic bid to the NCAA tournament as the 14th seed in the West region. Wright State was beaten by 3rd seed Pittsburgh in the first round, 79–58.

Roster 

Source

Schedule and results

|-
!colspan=12 style=|Exhibition

|-
!colspan=12 style=|Regular season

|-
!colspan=12 style=| Horizon League tournament

|-
!colspan=12 style=| NCAA tournament

Source

References

Wright State Raiders men's basketball seasons
Wright State
Wright State
Wright State Raiders men's basketball
Wright State Raiders men's basketball